Ham and Petersham Cricket Club was established in 1815. In 2015 the cricket club celebrated its bicentenary.

Foundation
Cricket was originally played on Ham Common by the Albion Club in 1815. During the 19th century the Albion Club became known as Ham Albion. By 1891 the club was referred to as Ham and Petersham Cricket Club and this name has been retained up until the present day.

Location
The home ground, Ham Common, is located in Ham which borders the village of Petersham. It is surrounded by some notable houses, the edge of Richmond Park, Cassel Hospital and two pubs, The Hand and Flower and The New Inn. At one end of the ground is a pond; legend has it that the only player ever to hit the ball in the pond, a distance of 170m, was Gary Sobers.

The clubhouse
Up until the Second World War a tent was set up for the players to change in. Caricatures of Jack Hobbs and Fred Burgess (the first XI captain in 1913) were drawn on the side of the tent. In 1927 a clubhouse was erected on Ham Common but the club was soon forced to take it down by Ham Urban District Council as it is common land. In 1968 the committee raised funds to build a clubhouse adjacent to the Hand and Flower pub. In 2013, after another fundraising effort, a new clubhouse was built and was opened by England and Surrey cricketer Alec Stewart on 17 April 2013.

Famous players
Some famous cricketers have graced the field on Ham Common, including Shane Warne, Imran Khan, Gary Sobers, Tom Richardson, Jack Hobbs, Andy Sandham, Herbert Strudwick, Peter May, Alec Bedser and Bill Brockwell. Celebrity players have included Michael Parkinson, Roy Castle, Tim Theakston of Theakston Brewery and Tim Rice.

Great club players
Bill Brockwell, who played for England and Surrey in the 19th century, was probably the finest cricketer to regularly play for the club. He lived at Rajinda Cottage on Ham Common and was the vice-president of the club prior to World War I.

The best player of the 20th century was Richard Harrison, a quick bowler who batted at number 4. Harrison retired from cricket in 1999.

Score books
The earliest surviving scorecard dates back to a match between Ham Albion and Twickenham Cricket Club that took place on Tuesday 13 July 1841. Ham Albion won by an innings and 87 runs. A scorecard from a match played against Brentford Cricket Club in 1855 also exists. The local newspaper, The Surrey Comet, recorded at the time that "at the conclusion of the game the players partook of an excellent supper at The New Inn, which was supplied by Mr Adam Goddard in his usual style and reflected credit on the worthy host".

Score book archive
Ham and Petersham Cricket Club Archive – 1978 to 1985

Ham and Petersham Cricket Club Archive – 1986 to 2009

Classic matches

Mackie's 9 and Claridge's 8
On 30 May 1982 J Mackie took 9 for 26 as Thames Ditton Old Boys achieved a total of 62. In reply Ham and Petersham could only manage 33, with J Mackie top scoring with 15 not out. The very next match, against Chertsey, J Mackie did not play. Ham and Petersham scored 198 and bowled Chertsey out for 14 with P Claridge taking 8 for 6.

Clarkie's Hundred
On 15 July 1984 the club's Chairman and opening batsman, Peter Clarke, scored a 100 not out. He would score over 500 runs that season.

Bobby Jordan 's debut
On 25 August 1985 Bobby Jordan made his debut for Ham and Petersham. With line and length swing bowling he took 7 wickets for 45 runs. On 3 September 2017, 32 years later, having been Chairman of Ham and Petersham for over a decade, Jordan played his last match, still bowling line and length swing and still taking wickets.

Yorkshire tour
In May 1979 the club went on its first tour to Yorkshire. This was arranged through former players and Yorkshire residents, Andrew Dallas and Tim Theakston. The Yorkshire Tour match was played against Theakston Brewery. In the 20 overs a side match Theakston Brewery 141 for 3 beat Ham and Petersham 95 all out In 2020, during the COVID-19 pandemic the club held a virtual Yorkshire Tour, complete with a virtual cricket match and virtual pub crawl. The tour has continued every year up until the present day.

Bicentennial year
The 2015 saw the club celebrate its 200th year. The anniversary was marked by six special celebrations.
 A cricket tour of India
 A cricket tour of Yorkshire
 A match against a celebrity Bunbury side, where Harry Judd and Nick Farr-Jones opened the batting for the opposition.
 A match against Surrey County Cricket Club legends
 A match at Lords
 A dinner dance at The Oval, with special guests Michael Parkinson, Simon Mann of Test Match Special and former England player and selector, Geoff Miller.

Club Presidents
 1897–1919 J.W Hacker
 1920 A. Mackenzie Hay
 1921–1924 Gerald Dumas
 1925 Brigadier H. Champion
 1926 Grey Jones
 1927–1931 E.B. Raikes
 1932–1935 Colonel C. Black
 1936–1940 Lieutenant Colonel A. Bromhead
 1955–1959 Major W. McGrath
 1959–1967 Philip Carr
 1968–1971 Horace Emery
 1972–1978 Frank Vickery
 1978–1998 Bill Peer
 1998–present Simon Penniston

1st XI Captains

League Cricket
Since the early 2000s, Ham and Petersham Cricket Club has played in the Surrey Cricket League. In 2017 Ham and Petersham Cricket Club switched to the Fuller's Brewery Surrey County League.

References

Bibliography
 Philpot, Peter. A History of Ham and Petersham Cricket Club 1815–1985, 1985
 Twickenham Cricket Club 1833–1933: The First One Hundred Years,  Twickenham: Walker and Co.,1933
 Club Cricket Conference Handbook, first edition, 1915

External links
 Official website
 Surrey Cricket League
 Fuller's Brewery Surrey County League

1815 establishments in England
Cricket clubs established in the 1810s
English club cricket teams
Ham, London
Organizations established in 1815
Petersham, London
Sport in the London Borough of Richmond upon Thames